Richland Township is a township in Butler County, Kansas, United States.  As of the 2000 census, its population was 2,399.

History
Richland Township was organized in 1874.

Geography
According to the USGS, it contains two cemeteries: Friends and Richland.

The stream of Maple Creek runs through this township.

Further reading

References

 USGS Geographic Names Information System (GNIS)

External links
 City-Data.com

Townships in Butler County, Kansas
Townships in Kansas